Geoinformatics is the science and the technology which develops and uses information science infrastructure to address the problems of geography, cartography, geosciences and related branches of science and engineering, such as Land Surveying.

Overview
Geoinformatics has been described as "the science and technology dealing with the structure and character of spatial information, its capture, its classification and qualification, its storage, processing, portrayal and dissemination, including the infrastructure necessary to secure optimal use of this information" or "the art, science or technology dealing with the acquisition, storage, processing production, presentation and dissemination of geoinformation". Geomatics is a similarly used term which encompasses geoinformatics, but geomatics focuses more so on surveying. Geoinformatics has been grouped broadly under technical geography, along with fields like geographic information science. 

Geoinformatics has at its core the technologies supporting the processes of acquisition, analysis and visualization of spatial data. Both geomatics and geoinformatics include and rely heavily upon the theory and practical implications of geodesy.  Geography and earth science increasingly rely on digital spatial data acquired from remotely sensed images analyzed by geographical information systems (GIS), photo interpretation of aerial photographs, and Web mining. Geoinformatics combines geospatial analysis and modeling, development of geospatial databases, information systems design, human-computer interaction and both wired and wireless networking technologies. Geoinformatics uses geocomputation and geovisualization for analyzing geoinformation.

Areas related to geoinformatics include:

Research

Research in this field is used to support global and local environmental, energy and security programs. The Geographic Information Science and Technology group of Oak Ridge National Laboratory is supported by various government departments and agencies including the United States Department of Energy. It is currently the only group in the United States Department of Energy National Laboratory System to focus on advanced theory and application research in this field. A lot of interdisciplinary research exists that involves geoinformatics fields including computer science, information technology, software engineering, biogeography, geography, conservation, architecture, spatial analysis and reinforcement learning.

Applications

Many fields benefit from geoinformatics, including urban planning and land use management, in-car navigation systems, virtual globes, land surveying, public health, local and national gazetteer management, environmental modeling and analysis, military, transport network planning and management, agriculture, meteorology and climate change, oceanography and coupled ocean and atmosphere modelling, business location planning, architecture and archeological reconstruction, telecommunications, criminology and crime simulation, aviation, biodiversity conservation and maritime transport.
The importance of the spatial dimension in assessing, monitoring and modelling various issues and problems related to sustainable management of natural resources is recognized all over the world.

Geoinformatics becomes very important technology to decision-makers across a wide range of disciplines, industries, commercial sector, environmental agencies, local and national government, research, and academia, national survey and mapping organisations, International organisations, United Nations, emergency services, public health and epidemiology, crime mapping, transportation and infrastructure, information technology industries, GIS consulting firms, environmental management agencies), tourist industry, utility companies, market analysis and e-commerce, mineral exploration, etc. Many government and non government agencies started to use spatial data for managing their day-to-day activities.

See also
Cartography
Crowdmapping
Geographic information science
Geographic information system
Geomathematics
Geomatics
Technical geography
Urban informatics

Organizations
 Open Geospatial Consortium
 International Association of Geodesy
 International Cartographic Association
 International Society for Photogrammetry and Remote Sensing
 International Union of Geodesy and Geophysics

References

External links
 Geoinformatics Jobs Portal

Earth sciences
Geographical technology
Information science by discipline
Computational fields of study
Geographic data and information fields of study